This is a list of episodes for the series Captain N: The Game Master. While the Season 2 and Season 3 episodes were paired with episodes featuring the Super Mario Bros., the Captain N episodes themselves retained the title of Captain N: The Game Master. Season 3 episodes were half the time length of the previous seasons.

Series overview

Episodes

Season 1 (1989)

Season 2 (1990–1991)
For season 2, the show aired in an hour-long block in between two episodes of The Adventures of Super Mario Bros. 3.

Season 3 (1991)
The series was reduced to 11 minutes, as it shared a half-hour timeslot with Super Mario World. 7 were new, while 6 were reruns. In order to fill up the other 6 timeslots, 5 episodes from the first two seasons were edited down to 11 minutes. They were "Nightmare on Mother Brain's Street" (November 2, 1991), "Mr. and Mrs. Mother Brain", "Three Men and a Dragon", "Quest for the Potion of Power" (no footage was cut, but was split into two 11-minute parts, with the first part airing on November 23, 1991 and the second on November 30, 1991), and "The Invasion of the Paper Pedalers" (December 7, 1991).

1980s television-related lists
1990s television-related lists
Captain N: The Game Master